This is a list of cultural heritage sites that have been damaged or destroyed accidentally, deliberately, or by a natural disaster, sorted by continent, then by country.

Cultural heritage can be subdivided into two main types—tangible and intangible heritage. The former includes built heritage such as religious buildings, museums, monuments, archaeological sites, and movable heritage such as works of art and manuscripts. Intangible cultural heritage includes customs, music, fashion and other traditions within a particular culture. This article mainly deals with the destruction of built heritage; the destruction of movable collectible heritage is dealt with in art destruction, whilst the destruction of movable industrial heritage remains almost totally ignored.

Deliberate and systematic destruction of cultural heritage, such as that carried out by ISIL and other terrorist organizations, is regarded as a form of cultural genocide.

Africa

Egypt 

 The Library of Alexandria was destroyed during the Palmyrene invasion of Egypt and the following Roman counterattack during the 3rd century AD.
 In the late 12th century, Sultan Al-Aziz Uthman demolished part of the Pyramid of Menkaure.
 The Lighthouse of Alexandria, one of the Seven Wonders of the Ancient World, was heavily damaged by earthquakes in the 10th and 14th centuries, before being demolished in 1480 to make way for the Citadel of Qaitbay. Some stones from the lighthouse were used in the construction of the citadel, and some other remains have survived underwater.
 Villa Aghion, Alexandria.
 Objects stolen from the Mosque of Taghribirdi and Al-Rifai Mosque.
Institut d'Égypte, destroyed on 17 December 2011 during anti-government demonstrations.

Libya 

During the 2011 Libyan Civil War, various sites were vandalized, looted, or destroyed.
In March 2015, during the second civil war, the Islamic State destroyed Sufi shrines near Tripoli.

Madagascar
In November 1995, a fire broke out in the Rova of Antananarivo, a royal palace complex that had served as the home of monarchs in the Kingdom of Madagascar since the 17th century. The fire destroyed or severely damaged all of its buildings. The last 2 phases of the Manjakamiadana's (Queen's Palace) reconstruction was started by 2010, and by July 2020 the entire structure has been fully refurbished.

Mali 
The Great Mosque of Djenne was allowed to fall into disrepair after the conquest of Djenne by Seku Amadu in 1818. It was rebuilt in 1907, however.
Parts of the World Heritage Site of Timbuktu were destroyed after the Battle of Gao in 2012, despite condemnation by UNESCO, the OIC, Mali, and France.

Nigeria

 During the Benin Expedition of 1897, the British Empire launched a military campaign against Benin City, the capital of the Kingdom of Benin (no relation to the modern country known as Benin),  and looted and burned the city. The Walls of Benin and the Royal Palace of the Oba of Benin were destroyed, while the Benin Bronzes are currently preserved in the British Museum.
 During the 18th-19th century Fula jihads of West Africa, Fula jihadists destroyed Ngazargamu, the capital of the Bornu Empire.
 During the Battle of Gawakuke, the Sokoto Caliphate destroyed the Hausa city-state of Gobir.

South Africa 

 The 2021 Table Mountain fire partially or completely gutted several historical and/or culturally significant buildings and collections in the University of Cape Town, including Mostert's Mill (South Africa's oldest working windmill, built 1796) and the university's Special Collections Library, which held over 1,300 collections and over 85,000 books and other items, including a historically significant Bible, an original illustration of The Jungle Book, drawings, maps and transcripts of stories from the indigenous peoples of the Cape, a major dictionary of the isiXhosa language, copies of historic Xhosa language newspapers, papers by Ray Alexander Simons, and archives of papers relating to many anti-apartheid movements. It is known that the fire completely gutted the library's Reading Room but that a fire detection system prevented the fire from reaching the rest of the library, likely preserving most collections; however, some rare collections were likely lost. A later assessment found that a vast majority of the African Studies Published Print Collection (about 70,000 items) and the entirety of the African Studies Film Collection DVDs (about 3,500 items) had been destroyed, along with documents relating to the university itself as well as any manuscripts or archives being kept in the Reading Room for digitization or after being digitized, but that the rare and antique collections kept underground, including significant documentation and works of the San and Khoi people who lived in the area in the 1870s, had been preserved.

Zimbabwe
 Great Zimbabwe has faced some damage since the colonial era. The removal of gold and artifacts in amateurist diggings by early colonial antiquarians caused widespread damage, notably diggings by Richard Nicklin Hall, who was determined to find evidence that the monument wasn't built by indigenous Africans until he eventually relinquished this belief. More extensive damage was caused by the mining of some of the ruins for gold. Reconstruction attempts since 1980 caused further damage, leading to alienation of the local communities from the site. Another source of damage to the ruins has been due to the site being open to visitors with many cases of people climbing the walls, walking over archaeological deposits, and the over-use of certain paths all have had major impacts on the structures at the site. These are in conjunction with damages due to the natural weathering that occurs over time due to vegetation growth, the foundations settling, and erosion from the weather.

Asia

Afghanistan 

 During the Soviet invasion, large-scale looting occurred in various archaeological sites including Hadda, ancient site of Ai-Khanoum, the Buddhist monastery complex in Tepe Shortor which dates back to the 2nd century AD, and the National Kabul Museum. These sites were ransacked by various pillagers, including the pro-Russian government forces, destitute villagers, and the local crime rings. The National Museum of Afghanistan suffered the greatest damage, in which the systematic looting has plundered the museum collection and the adjacent Archaeological Institute. As a result, more than two-thirds of one hundred thousand pieces of museum treasures and artifacts were lost or destroyed.
 A pair of 6th-century monumental statues known as the Buddhas of Bamiyan were dynamited by the Taliban in 2001, who had declared them heretical idols.

Armenia

 In 1870, a report by the Viceroyalty of the Caucasus recorded 269 Shia mosques in the region.

After 1917, many of the city's religious buildings were demolished in accordance with the Soviet government's modernization and anti-religious policies. A mosque in Yerevan was pulled down with a bulldozer at the beginning of the year 1990, which was done as a result of Azerbaijan destroying the Armenian church in Baku. Today there is only one mosque remaining in the city.

Azerbaijan 

Azerbaijani authorities destroyed the Armenian cemetery in Julfa in December 2005 in the region of Nakhchivan. Azerbaijani representative of Nakhchivan denied that there was an Armenian cemetery there in the first place.
Azerbaijani authorities demolished the Church of the Holy Virgin in Baku in 1992 as part of their "de-Armenisation" campaign which also took place in Nakhichevan. The rest was turned into a restaurant.

Bahrain 
 At least 43 Shia mosques, including the ornate 400-year-old Amir Mohammed Braighi mosque, and many other religious structures were destroyed by the Bahraini government during the Bahraini uprising of 2011.

China 
 The historical Famen Temple went through several periods of destruction. First erected during the Eastern Han dynasty (AD 25–220), it was destroyed during the years of the Northern Zhou dynasty (557–581). After being rebuilt, it was destroyed again by an earthquake during the Longqing's years (1567–1572) of the Ming dynasty. After another reconstruction, it was destroyed again during the Cultural Revolution of 1966–1976. The present structure was completed in 1987.
 The Huang Chao rebellion (874–884) devastated the city of Chang'an, a historical capital of several ancient Chinese empires. The city was sacked and occupied by the rebels who looted and demolished the buildings, whose materials were then reused to build the subsequent capital city of Luoyang. Chang'an never recovered after this obliteration, and it was followed by the decline of the Tang dynasty. Huang Chao's former lieutenant Zhu Wen completed the destruction by dismantling Chang'an and transporting the materials east to Luoyang.  A medieval Chinese source claimed that Huang Chao killed 8 million people. Huang Chao's army in southern China committed the Guangzhou massacre against foreign Arab and Persian Muslim, Zoroastrian, Jewish and Christian merchants in 878-879 at the seaport and trading entrpot of Guangzhou.
 During the systematic persecution of Buddhists in AD 845 by the Taoist Emperor Wuzong of Tang, more than 4,600 Buddhist temples were destroyed across the empire.
 In 955, Emperor Shizong of the Later Zhou ordered the systematic destruction of Buddha statues due to the need for copper to mint coins. The ordinance led to the destruction of 3,336 of China's 6,030 Buddhist temples.
 In 1739, the Pagoda of Chengtian Temple was destroyed after a large earthquake struck the city of Yinchuan. The pagoda was subsequently restored in 1820.
 The Porcelain Tower of Nanjing, which dates back to the 15th century, was destroyed during the course of the Taiping Rebellion (1850–1864). A modern life-size replica was built in 2015.
 In 1860, much of the Old Summer Palace, a Qing-era imperial palace, was set on fire and sacked during the Second Opium War. The palace was later sacked again and destroyed by the Eight-Nation Alliance when they invaded Beijing.
 Beijing city fortifications which date back to the 15th–16th century were destroyed through the course of the decline of the Qing dynasty in the late 19th to early 20th century. They were severely damaged during the Boxer Rebellion (1898–1901), with the gate towers and watchtowers destroyed and troops of the Eight-Nation Alliance tearing down much of the outer city walls. After the collapse of the Qing in 1912, and end of the Republic of China in 1949, the fortifications were dismantled to build modern ring roads around Beijing. Today, nothing of the Outer City remains intact.
 In 1921, Buddhist murals at the Mogao Caves were damaged and vandalized by White Russian soldiers fleeing the Russian Civil War.
 On 8 June 1928, the soldiers of warlord Sun Dianying ransacked Qing Imperial tombs including the tombs of Empress Dowager Cixi and the Qianlong Emperor.
 Buddhist murals at the Bezeklik Thousand Buddha Caves were damaged by the local Muslim population. The eyes and mouths in particular were often gouged out. Pieces of murals were also broken off for use as fertilizer by the locals.
 During the Kumul Rebellion in Xinjiang in the 1930s, Buddhist murals were vandalized by Muslims.
 Yongdingmen, the former front gate of the outer city wall of the Beijing city fortifications, which dates back to 1553, was demolished in the 1950s to make way for the new road system. It was rebuilt in 2005.
 The Gate of China in Beijing was demolished by the Chinese government in 1954 to make way for the expansion of Tiananmen Square.
 A shrine dedicated to Wei Yan was destroyed by the Chinese government in 1968. A stone tablet which contained the record of his presence was lost after the demolition. The shrine was rebuilt in 1995.
 During the Cultural Revolution of the 1960s and 1970s, many artifacts, monuments, and buildings belonging to the Four Olds were attacked and destroyed, including:
White Horse Temple in Luoyang, the oldest Buddhist temple in China. Some historical artifacts are still missing.
Famen Buddhist Temple, Shaanxi.
Tomb and remains of Ming Emperor Wanli and empresses.
 According to anthropologist Robert E. Murowchick, a quarter million tombs have been raided since the 1990s to rob the antiquities which lay beneath them. Murowchick points out that growing demand for antiquities from both domestic and international markets have encouraged the tomb raiding in China.
 China's aggressive development has resulted in the destruction of more than 30,000 items listed by the state administration of cultural heritage, compiled from various archaeological and historic sites. One conservation campaigner tells that the rate of destruction is worse than during the Cultural Revolution. Destroyed heritage sites include the old town in Dinghai, the old town of Laoximen in Shanghai, a centuries-old market street in Qianmen, and a section of the Great Wall of China. Historical neighborhoods of Beijing and Nanjing were also razed.
 The construction of the Three Gorges Dam on the Yangtze River caused water levels to rise, destroying entire cities as well as many historical locations along the river.
 In 2016, the Chinese government ordered the demolition of historical housings in the Larung Gar Tibetan Buddhist institution.
 By 2017, the old town of Kashgar had been destroyed by the Chinese government, and replaced by a significantly smaller and lower-quality "theme park" version of the site.
 During the 2020 China floods, multiple historic bridges were destroyed, including the Lecheng Bridge and the Zhenhai Bridge.

India 
In 1024, during the reign of Bhima I, the prominent Afghan ruler Mahmud of Ghazni raided Gujarat, plundered and destroyed the Somnath temple and broke its jyotirlinga. In 1299, Alauddin Khalji's army under the leadership of Ulugh Khan defeated Karandev II of the Vaghela dynasty, and sacked the (rebuilt) Somnath temple. By 1665, the rebuilt temple was once again ordered destroyed by Mughal emperor Aurangzeb. In 1702, he ordered that if Hindus had revived worship there, it should be demolished completely.
In 1323, when the Kakatiya dynasty refused to pay tribute to the Delhi Sultanate, Ulugh Khan under orders from his father and sultan Ghiyath al-Din Tughluq laid siege to the Warangal Fort and destroyed it.
Around 1200 CE, the most prominent seats of learning in Ancient India, Nalanda University, Buddhist Monasteries and Educational centers of Vikramasila and Odantapuri were sacked and destroyed by Bengal ruler Muhammad bin Bakhtiyar Khalji.
The famous Martand Sun Temple, located in Jammu and Kashmir, was destroyed by the Muslim Sultan Sikandar Butshikan in the early 15th century, with demolition lasting a year.
In 1565 CE, after the Battle of Talikota, the capital city of Vijayanagara, with all its temples, palaces, mansions and monuments, was sacked and destroyed by an invading army raised by the five Bahamani Sultanates. What remains now are the ruins of Hampi.
In 1664, Aurangzeb destroyed the Kashi Vishwanath Mandir and built the Gyanvapi Mosque over its walls. The remnants of the temple wall can still be seen today, as was depicted in the 19th century sketch by James Prinsep. Christian missionary Edwin Greaves (1909), of the London Missionary Society, described the site as follows: "At the back of the mosque and in continuation of it are some broken remains of what was probably the old Bishwanath Temple. It must have been a right noble building; there is nothing finer, in the way of architecture in the whole city, than this scrap. A few pillars inside the mosque appear to be very old also."
In 1696, the Madrasa Mahmud Gawan of Bidar was struck by lightning and a part of it was destroyed.
On 6 December 1992, the Babri Masjid was destroyed by Hindu nationalists
On 26 April 2016, the National Museum of Natural History, New Delhi and its valuable collection of animal fossils and stuffed animals was destroyed by fire.

Indonesia

 Kraton Majapahit, the royal palace of Majapahit emperors, was destroyed in a rebellion. What remained of the palace and fortifications around it was further looted by treasure hunters during the Dutch colonial era.
The original Gambir railway station. Demolished in 1988 due making new overpass line.
 In 2016 it was discovered that the wrecks of cruiser HNLMS Java, HNLMS De Ruyter, HMS Exeter, destroyer HNLMS Kortenaer, HMS Electra, HMS Encounter and USS Pope which are located in the Java Sea have been destroyed by illegal salvage operations.
 The roof that covers the line 1 and 2 was demolished in 2019 due to expansion of the Jatinegara Station. The original station still remains.

Iran 
In 330 BC, Alexander the Great sent the main force of his army to Persepolis by the Royal Road and destroyed it.
During the reign of Naser al-Din Shah Qajar, the Nahavand castle was ruined hoping to find treasures beneath.

Iraq 

 The Hanging Gardens of Babylon, one of the Seven Wonders of the Ancient World, are believed to have been destroyed sometime after the 1st century AD. Their existence is not confirmed by archaeology, and there have been suggestions that the gardens were purely mythical.
 The Round City of Baghdad, the seat of the Abbasid caliph, was sacked by the Mongols led by Hulegu in 1258. Large section of the city as well as irrigation system and the House of Wisdom, a library and intellectual center, were destroyed. The city was attacked again by Tamerlane in 1401, leading to the almost destruction.
 Several historical gates of Baghdad dating back to the 12th century were demolished by the occupying Allied and Ottoman forces during the First World War.
 Since the U.S.-led invasion of Iraq in 2003, various archaeological sites and museums have been looted, including the ancient cities of Adab, Hatra and Isin where U.S. military protection was absent. The most prominent among them being the Iraq Museum where as much as 170,000 items were looted, including the 5,000 year old statues. In addition, several sites such as Babylon saw the destruction of its archaeology-rich subsoil as a result of military planning.
 During the civil war ensued the 2003 invasion, several historical sites were destroyed by various groups. In 2006 and 2007, Al-Askari Mosque was bombed by Sunni militants twice in the course of two years. In 2006, the Minaret of Anah and the statue of Al-Mansur were bombed by Shia militant and destroyed. All the aforementioned buildings were later reconstructed.
 The Islamic State of Iraq and Syria (ISIS) destroyed much of the cultural heritage in the areas it controlled in Iraq. At least 28 religious buildings were looted and destroyed, including Shiite mosques, tombs, shrines and churches. In addition, numerous ancient and medieval sites and artifacts, including the ancient cities of Nimrud and Hatra, parts of the wall of Nineveh, the ruins of Bash Tapia Castle and Dair Mar Elia, and artifacts from the Mosul Museum were also destroyed.

Israel and Palestine 

 The First Temple in Jerusalem was destroyed by the Neo-Babylonian Empire in 587 BCE, and the Second Temple by the Roman Empire in 70 CE.
Following the conquest of the Old City of Jerusalem by the Arab Legion in 1948, under the Jordanian annexation, Jewish sites were systematically damaged and destroyed. In particular, all but one of the thirty-five synagogues of the Jewish Quarter were destroyed.
 Following Israel's victory during the 1967 Six-Day War the Israeli military destroyed a large part of the Moroccan Quarter in Jerusalem's Old Town to make room for a plaza in front of the Western Wall.
 The Baptist Church of Jerusalem in Narkis Street was burned down by Jewish Nationalists in 1982, and subjected to an arson attack in 2007.
In 1996, the Jerusalem Islamic Waqf began unauthorized construction on the Temple Mount, damaging ancient structures and weakening the stability of the Southern Wall. 300 truckloads of topsoil were excavated and dumped in the Kidron Valley without permitting proper archaeological care. (See Temple Mount Sifting Project).
In 2015, in one of a series of attacks on churches in Israel and the West Bank by Jewish extremist groups, a former settler on the West Bank torched and set fire to the Church of the Multiplication in Tabgha on the shore of the Sea of Galilee in northern Israel. This was the church where some Christians believe Jesus to have carried out his miracle of the feeding of the 5000.
Joseph's Tomb in the city of Nablus has been repeatedly vandalized, with Palestinian mobs burning and pillaging it immediately after the withdrawal of Israeli forces in 2000, in 2003, and in 2009, when the tomb was vandalized with graffiti including swastikas. The tomb was vandalized again by Palestinian rioters in 2015 and 2022.

Japan 
The majority of Japanese castles were smashed and destroyed in the late 19th century in the Meiji restoration by the Japanese people and government in order to modernize and westernize Japan and break from their past feudal era of the Daimyo and Shoguns. It was only due to the 1964 Summer Olympics in Japan that concrete replicas of those castles were  built for tourists. The vast majority of castles in Japan today are new replicas made out of concrete. In 1959 a concrete keep was built for Nagoya castle.
An earth wall with uneven stones made up the original base of Komine Castle before it collapsed in the 1970s due to rain. The Japanese local government repaired it with concrete and the entire section of the repaired wall was destroyed by the earthquake in 2011 due to using concrete. The Japanese government then begged for photographs of the original wall from local citizens as they had no idea what it looked like to repair it to its original state.
The destroyed Kumamoto Castle, Fushimi Castle, Hiroshima Castle were rebuilt with concrete after World War II and Tokyo Imperial Palace was rebuilt after World War II. Kinkaku-ji was rebuilt after a monk burned it down. Kyoto Imperial Palace was rebuilt in 1855.
The Japanese used mostly concrete in 1934 to rebuild the Togetsukyo Bridge, unlike the original destroyed wooden version of the bridge from 836.
Japanese had to look at old paintings in order to find out what the Horyuji temple used to look like when they rebuilt it. 
During the Meiji restoration's Shinbutsu bunri, tens of thousands of Japanese Buddhist religious statues and temples were smashed and destroyed. Japan then closed and shut done tens of thousands of traditional old Shinto shrines in the Shrine Consolidation Policy and the Meiji government built the new modern 15 shrines of the Kenmu restoration as a political move to link the Meiji restoration to the Kenmu restoration for their new State Shinto cult.
Japanese building company Kongō Gumi started using CAD software and concrete with wood to build temples after the Meiji restoration.
The Japanese built a Bodhisattva Avalokiteśvara (Kannon) statue out of concrete at a temple Ryozen Kannon in Kyoto which was constructed after World War II.
The Japanese in 1958 used concrete to rebuild the Kannon-do temple at the Senso-ji Temple in Toko after it was destroyed in 1945 in World War II.
Kumamoto Castle, Kumamoto: Seriously damaged in 1877 during the Siege of Kumamoto Castle, part of the larger Satsuma Rebellion; subsequently rebuilt in the 1960s, with further historical restoration work completed from 1998 to 2008. The castle was again seriously damaged during 2016 Kumamoto earthquakes, with the required rebuilding effort estimated to take several decades.
Shuri Castle, a palace of the Ryukyu Kingdom first built in the 14th century, was destroyed during the Battle of Okinawa in World War II. The Japanese forces had set up a defense perimeter which goes through the underground of the castle. U.S. military targeted this location by shelling with the battleship USS Mississippi (BB-41) for three days in May 1945. The castle burned down subsequently after. It was later reconstructed in the 1990s. On the morning of 31 October 2019, the main courtyard structures of the castle were again destroyed in a fire.
The Kinkaku-ji (Golden Pavilion) of Kyoto was burnt down by an arsonist in 1950, but was restored in 1955.
A large number of Important Cultural Property, libraries, museums, and other archives were damaged or destroyed by the 2011 Tōhoku earthquake and tsunami.
Blood tax riots, the Japanese Meiji government brutally put down revolts by Japanese samurai angry that the traditional untouchable status of burakumin was legally revoked.

Malaysia
Candi Number 11 also known as Candi Sungai Batu Estate, a 1,200 year old ruin of a tomb-temple located in the Bujang Valley historical complex in Kedah was demolished in 2013 by housing developers who claimed not to have known the historical significance of the stone edifice.

Maldives

On 7 February 2012, in the aftermath of the coup in which Mohamed Nasheed was toppled as President, the National Museum was stormed by Islamists who destroyed Buddhist artifacts. Most of Maldive's Buddhist physical history was obliterated. Hindu artifacts were also targeted for obliteration and the actions have been compared to the attacks on the Buddhas by the Taliban.

Myanmar 
Shwedagon Paya temple complex in Yangon, built c. 6th and 10th centuries AD, was severely damaged after Cyclone Nargis passed the region in 2008, which caused the worst natural disaster in the recorded history of Myanmar.

Nepal 
The 7.8  Nepal earthquake in 2015 demolished heritages in Kathmandu valley. It destroyed centuries old medieval temples and palaces in the Kathmandu, Bhaktapur and Patan Durbar Squares along with the tower of Dharahara, the temple of Changunarayan, some temples of the Pahupatinath complex, the main stupa of Boudhanath and the temples of Swayambhunath Stupa.

Pakistan 
The Archaeological site of Harappa which dates back to 2600 BCE was heavily damaged during the Indian Rebellion of 1857. Bricks from the ruins were brought out and used as track ballast during the construction of Lahore–Multan railway line. Since the discovery, the site was constantly being damaged by the local farmers in the process of turning it into an agriculture land.
Sun Temple of Multan, a grand Hindu temple dedicated to the Sun deity built in 614 CE or earlier, was destroyed in the late 10th century by Ismaili rulers and a mosque was built atop it, which was also destroyed in the 11th century by Mahmud of Ghazni. The ruins of the temple exist in modern day Multan, Pakistan.
Prahladpuri Temple, Multan, was destroyed by a Muslim mob in 1992 in the aftermath of Babri mosque destruction in neighboring India.
Shaheed Ganj Mosque in Lahore was demolished by the Sikhs in 1935. Sikhs had been occupying the public square near the mosque since the capture of Lahore by Bhangi Misl in the 18th century. The conflict concerning the mosque had heightened during the colonial era, as Muslims were forbidden to pray there by the mosque administration. The demolishing of the mosque had led to the Muslims protesters holding marches toward the mosque, which was dispersed by the police opening fire on them.
Looters and the Taliban destroyed much of Pakistan's Buddhist artifacts left over from the Buddhist Gandhara civilization especially in Swat Valley. Gandhara Buddhist relics were deliberately targeted by the Taliban for destruction, and illegally looted by smugglers. Kushan era Buddhist stupas and statues in Swat valley, including the Jehanabad Buddha's face, were demolished by the Taliban. The government was criticized for doing nothing to safeguard the statue after the initial attempt at destroying the Buddha, which did not cause permanent harm, and when the second attack took place on the statue the feet, shoulders, and face were demolished. A rehabilitation attempt on the Buddha was made by Luca Olivieri and a group from Italy.

Philippines
 During the Spanish Colonization of the Philippine islands, the Spanish observed native structures called Kota or citadels made of large wooden houses or lime stones which made up the ancient cosmopolitan city-states of Luzon , Visayas and even in Mindanao.
 The City of Cainta was a fortified city. According to the descriptions by early Spanish chroniclers, it was surrounded by bamboo thickets, defended by a log wall, stone bulwarks and several lantakas, and an arm of the Pasig River flowed through the middle of the city, dividing it into two settlements. with a population with about a thousand inhabitants, and was surrounded by very tall and very dense bamboo thickets, and fortified with a wall and a few small culverins. The same river as that of Manila circles around the village and a branch of it passes through the middle dividing it in two sections. As described in the anonymous 1572 account documented in Volume 3 of Blair and Robertson's compiled translations: In August 1571, Miguel Lopez de Legazpi assigned his nephew, Juan de Salcedo, to "pacify" Cainta. After travelling several days upriver, Salcedo lay siege to the city, and eventually found a weak spot on the wall. The final Spanish attack over 400 residents of Cainta killed including their leader Gat Maitan.
 Kota Selurong was the walled city of Manila along the south bank of the Pasig River. Kota Seludong, the seat of the power of the Kingdom of Maynila that was protected by a rammed earth fortress equipped with stockades, battlements and cannons. the Kota were destroyed in 1570 siege, after the Spanish forces invaded the city. Spanish accounts claim that Martin de Goiti ordered his men to set the city in fire.

During the Battle of Manila in 1945, most of the city's unique architecture was destroyed. After the battle, in the business district, only two buildings dating to before the war remained intact, and these buildings' plumbing had been looted. After the war ended, much of Manila was rebuilt in a modernist style, and thus the original architectural heritage of the city is largely lost.
Manila Jai Alai Building, a historic jai alai venue demolished in 2000 which was opposed by heritage conservationists. The demolition led to the passage of the National Cultural Heritage Act of 2009.
Several historic buildings were damaged or destroyed during the 2013 Bohol earthquake, including the Loboc Church, the Loon Church, the Maribojoc Church and the Baclayon Church.
The Philippine Su Kuang Institute building was demolished in 2017 after the owners sold the building to a private developer within the same year. The 1940s was the last Art Deco wooden school structure in Binondo, Manila.

Saudi Arabia 

 Various mosques and other historic sites, especially those relating to early Islam, have been destroyed in Saudi Arabia. Apart from early Islamic sites, other buildings such as the Ajyad Fortress were also destroyed. This is done for economic reasons, to create room to accommodate hajj pilgrims (including luxury facilities for wealthy guests), as well as for ideological reasons related to the iconoclastic religious doctrine of the state Wahhabi sect.
Ajyad Fortress of the Ottomans demolished for commercial development of the Mecca Royal Hotel Clock Tower.

Singapore
 The Singapore Stone was blown up in 1843 to make way for Fort Fullerton.

South Korea
 Hwangnyongsa, a massive Buddhist temple in Gyeongju which dates back to the 7th century, was burned down by the Mongolians during their invasion in 1238.
 Hundreds of Buddhist monasteries were shut down or destroyed during the Joseon period as a part of anti-Buddhism policy. In 1407, during the reign of Taejong, the regulations were imposed on the number of Buddhist temples which limited to 88. Sejong the Great further reduced the number to 36. Many Buddhist statues were also destroyed during the reign of Jungjong (1506–1544).
Namdaemun was damaged by fire caused by arson in 2008. It reopened in 2013.
In March 2021, a main hall of the historic Naejangsan temple in Jeongeup, was burned into ashes by a 53-year-old monk arsonist.

Sri Lanka 
 The Palace of King Parakramabahu I of Polonnaruwa was set into fire by the Kalinga Magha lead Indian invaders in the 11th century. The ruins and the effect of the fire is still visible.
 The Library of Jaffna, which had over 97,000 manuscripts, was burned in 1981, as a part of the Sri Lankan war.

Syria 

The Aleppo Codex, the authoritative Hebrew Bible text, was partially destroyed during anti-Jewish riots in Syria in 1947.

Much of Syria's cultural heritage was damaged, destroyed, or looted during the Syrian Civil War. Destroyed buildings include the minaret of the Great Mosque of Aleppo and the Al-Madina Souq, while others such as Krak des Chevaliers were damaged.
Khusruwiyah Mosque (Husrev Mosque).
 The Islamic State of Iraq and the Levant (ISIL) destroyed the Lion of Al-lāt, the temples of Bel and Baalshamin, the Arch of Triumph, and other sites in Palmyra. The group also destroyed the Monastery of St. Elian, the Armenian Genocide Memorial Church, and several ancient sculptures in the city of Raqqa.
 During the Turkish military operation in Afrin in 2018, Turkish shelling seriously damaged the ancient temple of Ain Dara in Afrin.

Thailand
In June 1932 in Siam—now Thailand—a revolution overthrew 700 years of absolute monarchy. A political structure based on a constitution that required non-royal governments elected by the people, was introduced. On 10 December 1936, the first post-revolution prime minister, Phraya Phahon, held a small ceremony to embed a small plaque the size of a dinner plate into the ground at the spot, in front of Bangkok's Ananta Samakhom Throne Hall, where he had first announced the end of the absolute monarchy. The inscription on it read: "Here on 24 June 1932 at dawn, the People's Party proclaimed a constitution for the country's advancement."

Eighty years later, sometime between 2–8 April 2017, the democracy plaque was replaced by a new plaque. Its message read: "To love and respect the Buddhist trinity, one's own state, one's own family, and to have a heart faithful to your monarch, will bring prosperity to the country". Prime Minister Prayut Chan-o-cha dismissed the theft and replacement of the plaque as unimportant. The police insisted they could not investigate the plaque's disappearance because they did not know who owned the plaque. Investigation stalled as all 11 CCTV cameras in the area had been removed days before the plaque was taken.

On 20 September 2020, a new updated version of the plaque was installed by democracy activists at Sanam Luang. Within a day of its installation it was removed by persons unknown.

Turkey 
 The Library of Antioch was ordered destroyed by the Roman Emperor Jovian in 363 AD.
 The Temple of Artemis, one of the Seven Wonders of the Ancient World, was destroyed by arson in 356 BC. It was later rebuilt, but was damaged in a raid by Goths in 268 AD. Its stones were subsequently used in other buildings. A few fragments of the structure still survive in situ.
 The Mausoleum at Halicarnassus, another Wonder of the Ancient World, was destroyed by a series of earthquakes between the 12th and 15th centuries. Most of the remaining marble blocks were burnt into lime, but some were used in the construction of Bodrum Castle by the Knights Hospitaller, where they can still be seen today. The only other surviving remains of the mausoleum are some foundations in situ, a few sculptures in the British Museum, and some marble blocks which were used to build a dockyard in Malta's Grand Harbour
Port city of Izmir (Smyrna) during the Great fire of Smyrna in the aftermath of the Greco-Turkish war.

 The abandonment and confiscation of Armenian monasteries and cultural heritage in places such as Ani contributed to their eventual destruction. In 1974, UNESCO stated that after 1923, out of 913 Armenian historical monuments left in Eastern Turkey, 464 had vanished completely, 252 were in ruins, and 197 needed repair. In 2011, there were 34 Armenian churches functioning in Turkey, primarily in Istanbul.

Turkmenistan 
 The Church of the Transfiguration in Ashgabat was destroyed in 1932 by the Soviet Government. 
The country's only Bahá’í Temple, in Ashgabat (called Ishqabad by its followers) which was completed in 1908 was later destroyed in 1962 after being damages in the 1948 Earthquake.

Europe

Albania 
Sulejman Pasha Mosque, the dome and mosque were destroyed during World War II, while its minaret remained until 1967, when the communist regime of Enver Hoxha built a war memorial in its place. Many religious sites have also been destroyed over the years.

Austria 
Vienna's Cathedral of St. Stephen was severely damaged by fire in 1945, towards the end of the Second World War. Incendiary bombs and shelling had set the roof on fire, and the cathedral's original larch girders, said to be made from an entire forest of larches, were destroyed, as were the Rollinger choir stalls, carved in 1487. The building was rebuilt soon after the war.

Belgium 
 The Palace of Coudenberg in Brussels burned down in 1731 and its ruins were demolished half a century later.
 Many churches and abbeys were demolished during the French occupation in the late 18th century, amongst them the St. Lambert's Cathedral in Liège, the St. Donatian's Cathedral and Eekhout Abbey in Bruges, Florennes Abbey in Florennes, and St. Michael's Abbey in Antwerp.
 The Herkenrode Abbey in Hasselt survived the French Revolution, but subsequently fell into disrepair. In 1826 a fire destroyed much of the church, and the remaining ruins were demolished in 1844.
 On 25 August 1914, during World War I, the university library of Leuven was destroyed by the Germans. 230,000 volumes were lost, including medieval and Renaissance manuscripts and more than 1,000 incunabula. After the war, a new library was built. During World War II, the new building was again set on fire and nearly a million books were lost.
 During World War I, the city of Ypres was destroyed, including its Town Hall and Cloth Hall. These monuments were later rebuilt.
 The Maison du Peuple in Brussels, one of the largest works of architect Victor Horta, was demolished in 1965 to make way for an office building. The surviving buildings designed by Horta were declared UNESCO World Heritage in 2000.
 Château Miranda, a 19th century neo-Gothic castle in Celles was demolished in 2016-17.
 The Valemprez farm, a 13th century farmhouse rebuilt in the 18th century in Dottignies. It was demolished in 2008

Bosnia and Herzegovina 

 Through the course of the Bosnian War, numerous sites of cultural and religious heritage were destroyed:
 In the Bosnian War during the Siege of Sarajevo, culturcide was committed by Army of Republika Srpska. The National and University Library of Bosnia and Herzegovina was specifically targeted and besieged by cannons positioned all around the city and it was destroyed in the fire, along with 80 percent of its contents. Some 3 million books destroyed, along with hundreds of original documents from the Ottoman Empire and the Austro-Hungarian monarchy.
Muslim heritage sites suffered the most, with 614 mosques and several other religious facilities, schools, and institutions destroyed by the authorities of the Republic of Srpska as a part of the ethnic cleansing campaign against the local Muslim populations. The most well known among them include Mehmed Pasha Kukavica Mosque, Arnaudija Mosque, and Ferhat Pasha Mosque. A substantial proportion of these mosques date back to the Ottoman and Austro-Hungarian era. 
Roman Catholic sites also suffered with more than 269 churches being destroyed, which was associated with the killings of Bosnian Croats, mostly by Bosnian Serbs. 
As many as 125 Serbian Orthodox religious buildings were destroyed in the war, such as the 13th-century Sase Monastery, Vozuća Monastery, and others.
Parts of the old city of Mostar, including the Stari Most, were destroyed by the Croatian Defence Council during the war. The Stari Most has been rebuilt. Another symbol of the city, the monumental Serbian Orthodox Cathedral of the Holy Trinity was shelled, set afire, and finally blown up by the local Croat forces. The reconstruction of the church is ongoing.

Croatia 

In the Independent State of Croatia 450 Serb Orthodox churches and monasteries were destroyed along with monumental iconostasis, thousands of icons and number of manuscripts and books which included archival books about births, weddings and deaths. The destroyed ritual items were of great cultural and historical importance and beauty.
War damage of the Croatian War (1991–1995) has been assessed on 2,271 protected cultural monuments, with the damage cost being estimated at 407 million DM. The largest numbers – 683 damaged cultural monuments – are located in the area of Dubrovnik and Neretva County. Most are situated in Dubrovnik itself. The entire buildings and possessions of 481 Roman Catholic churches, several synagogues, and several Serbian Orthodox churches were badly damaged or destroyed. Valuable inventories were looted from over 100 churches. The most drastic example of destruction of cultural monuments, art objects, and artifacts took place in Vukovar. After the occupation of the devastated city by the Yugoslav Army and Serbian paramilitary forces, portable cultural property was removed from shelters and museums in Vukovar to museums and archives in Serbia.
Church of St. Nicholas, Karlovac, destroyed between 1991 and 1993. Renovated in 2007.
Medieval Dragović monastery, Vrlika, destroyed in 1995. Reestablished in 2004.
 After Croatia gained independence, about 3,000 memorials dedicated to the anti-fascist resistance and the victims of fascism were destroyed.
 In September 1991, Croatian forces entered the memorial site of the Jasenovac Concentration Camp and vandalized the museum building, while exhibitions and documentation were destroyed, damaged and looted.

Czech Republic 
 The Old Town Hall in Prague was severely damaged by fire during the Prague uprising of 1945. The chamber where George of Poděbrady was elected King of Bohemia was devastated; the town hall's bell, the oldest in Bohemia, dating from 1313, was melted; and the city archives, comprising 70,000 volumes (most of which were transported to the outskirts of Prague due to the fear of the bombardment), as well as historically priceless manuscripts, were destroyed.

Denmark 
Copenhagen Fire of 1728, where a great part of medieval Copenhagen vanished.
Christiansborg Palace, main residence of the Danish Kings, destroyed by fire in 1794.
Copenhagen Fire of 1795, where a great part of medieval and renaissance Copenhagen vanished.
Hirschholm Palace, summer residence of the Danish Kings, demolished in 1809–1813 after it stood empty after its role in the affair between Johann Friedrich Struensee and Queen Caroline Matilda of Great Britain in the 1770s.

Estonia 
During World War II, 98% of the town of Narva was destroyed due to Soviet bombing raids. Only 3 buildings, including the town hall, are still remaining.

France 

During the Siege of Strasbourg that took place at the height of the Franco-Prussian War in 1870, the total destruction by shelling and fire of the municipal library and the municipal art and archaeology collections resulted in the loss of 400,000 books, 3,446 Medieval manuscripts, and thousands of incunables, as well as of hundreds of paintings, stained glass windows, and archaeological artefacts. The most famous lost object was the original manuscript of the Hortus deliciarum.
On 23 May 1871, the Tuileries Palace, which had been the usual Parisian residence of French monarchs, was almost entirely gutted in a fire set by members of the Paris Commune, leaving only the stone shell. It was subsequently demolished in 1883.
In 1914, Reims Cathedral was burned as a result of shelling during the initial phase of the First World War. The cathedral was rebuilt after the war.
The 1978 Palace of Versailles bombing severely damaged parts of the Palace of Versailles, including several priceless pieces of art. The palace was rebuilt and reopened to the public within four years.
On 15 April 2019, the roof of the Notre-Dame de Paris caught fire, severely damaging the bell towers and resulting in the total collapse of the central spire and roof. The fire is believed to have been caused by the ongoing restoration, though an investigation is ongoing.

Germany 

Many historically and architecturally significant buildings were destroyed or severely damaged during World War II and the post-war period as a result of the Allied policy of area bombing of cities aimed at destroying or weakening infrastructure and war-related industry in the German Reich, as well as demoralizing the population by destroying urban cores and residential neighborhoods. Several hundred cities were destroyed, many of them by more than 80 percent. Striking examples are palaces like Berlin Palace, Monbijou Palace, and City Palace, Potsdam, as well as churches like Dresden Frauenkirche, Berlin Cathedral, and Kaiser Wilhelm Memorial Church. Several have been rebuilt since 1990 (including all those mentioned except Monbijou Palace and Kaiser Wilhelm Memorial Church).
The Paulinerkirche was a medieval church from 1231 in Leipzig. The church survived the war practically unscathed but was dynamited in 1968 during the communist regime of East Germany. After the reunification of Germany, a new building in a contemporary style, the Paulinum, was built on the site.
The building housing the Historical Archive of the City of Cologne collapsed on 3 March 2009 during an underground railway line construction.
The Church of St. Lambertus in Immerath was demolished on 9 January 2018 as part of the demolition of the entire village to make way for an expansion of the Garzweiler surface mine. The church had been added to the list of heritage monuments in Erkelenz on 14 May 1985.
In October 2020, artworks displayed at various museums at Museumsinsel in Berlin were vandalized with a liquid that left stains on the artifacts.

Greece 
The Colossus of Rhodes, one of the Seven Wonders of the Ancient World, was destroyed in the 226 BC Rhodes earthquake, and its remains were destroyed in the 7th century AD while Rhodes was under Arab rule. In December 2015, a group of European architects announced plans to build a modern Colossus where the original once stood.
The Statue of Zeus at Olympia, also a Wonder of the Ancient World, was destroyed around the 5th century CE, although it is not known exactly when or how.
The Parthenon was extensively damaged in 1687 during the Great Turkish War (1683–1699). The Ottoman army fortified the Acropolis of Athens and used the Parthenon as a gunpowder magazine and a shelter for members of the local Turkish community. On 26 September, a Venetian mortar round blew up the magazine, and the explosion blew out the building's central portion. About three hundred people were killed in the explosion, which caused fires that burned until the following day and consumed many homes. The Parthenon was extensively and permanently damaged when Thomas Bruce, the 7th Earl of Elgin and ambassador to the Ottoman Empire (occupiers of Greece in the early 19th century), who admired the Parthenon's extensive collection of ancient marble sculptures, began extracting and expatriating them to Britain in 1801. More damage to the site's heritage came after independence, when all Medieval and Ottoman features of the Acropolis (most notably the Frankish Tower) were destroyed by Heinrich Schliemann in a project to rid the site of all post-Classical influence.

Hungary 
  (Destroyed buildings of Budapest and Destroyed buildings of Hungary, both in Hungarian)
Numerous historical buildings in Budapest were damaged or destroyed during World War II, including the Hungarian Parliament Building, the Chain Bridge, and the Sándor Palace. These three have now been rebuilt.

Ireland 
During the Battle of Dublin at the beginning of the Irish Civil War in 1922, munitions were stored at the Four Courts building, which housed 1,000 years of Irish records in the Public Record Office. Under circumstances that are disputed, the munitions exploded, destroying much of Ireland's historical record.
The Irish Republican Army followed a policy of deliberate destruction of Irish country houses (1919–1923).

Italy 

Many historic gardens and villas were destroyed in Rome in the 19th century, including Villa Ludovisi, Villa Negroni and Villa Astalli;
Tower of Paul III and Convent of Aracoeli, demolished to make room for the Victor Emmanuel Monument.
Various historic buildings were demolished in the 19th and 20th centuries to make way for railways, industrial areas, or other modern buildings. Examples include the Castello di Villagonia and the Real Cittadella in Sicily.
Many historic buildings in Italy were destroyed or damaged during World War II. These include the monastery of Monte Cassino, which was destroyed during the Battle of Monte Cassino but was rebuilt after the war.
Several historic buildings, books, paintings, and sculptures were destroyed during the Florence Flood of 1966. Also, Venice was affected during the flood of 1966.
Several churches and other heritage sites were damaged or destroyed during earthquakes such as the 1997 Umbria and Marche earthquake, the 2009 L'Aquila earthquake, and the August 2016 Central Italy earthquake.

Kosovo 

During the Yugoslavia period there was destruction of Albanian heritage endorsed by the state. A number of Albanian cultural sites in Kosovo were destroyed during the Kosovo conflict (1998–1999) which constituted a war crime violating the Hague and Geneva Conventions. In all 225 out of 600 mosques in Kosovo were damaged, vandalised, or destroyed alongside other Islamic architecture and Islamic libraries and archives with records spanning 500 years. Additionally 500 Albanian owned kulla dwellings (traditional stone tower houses) and three out of four well preserved Ottoman period urban centres located in Kosovo cities were badly damaged resulting in great loss of traditional architecture. Kosovo's public libraries, in particular 65 out of 183 were completely destroyed with a loss of 900,588 volumes. During the war, Islamic architectural heritage posed for Yugoslav Serb paramilitary and military forces as Albanian patrimony with destruction of non-Serbian architectural heritage being a methodical and planned component of ethnic cleansing in Kosovo.

During World War II, a number of Serbian Orthodox religious sites were damaged or destroyed. During the 1968 and 1981 protests, Serbian Orthodox religious sites were the target of vandalism, that continued during the 1980s. NATO bombing in March–June 1999 resulted in some accidental damages to churches and a mosque. Revenge attacks against Serbian religious sites commenced following the conflict and the return of hundreds of thousands of Kosovo Albanian refugees to their homes. Serbian cultural sites in Kosovo were systematically destroyed in the aftermath of the Kosovo War and 2004 ethnic violence. According to the International Center for Transitional Justice this includes 155 destroyed Serbian Orthodox churches and monasteries as well as Medieval Monuments in Kosovo, which were inscribed on the List of World Heritage in Danger.

Malta 

Parts of the megalithic Xagħra Stone Circle in Gozo were deliberately destroyed in around 1834–1835 and its megaliths were broken down to form masonry which was used in the construction of a nearby farmhouse. The site was subsequently forgotten for over a century before being rediscovered in the late 20th century.
A number of buildings of historical or architectural importance which had been included on the Antiquities List were destroyed by aerial bombardment during World War II, including Auberge d'Auvergne, Auberge de France and the Slaves' Prison in Valletta, the Clock Tower, Auberge d'Allemagne and Auberge d'Italie in Birgu, and two out of three megalithic temples at Kordin. Others such as Fort Manoel also suffered severe damage, but were rebuilt after the war.
Other buildings which were not included on the Antiquities List but which had significant cultural importance were also destroyed during the war. The most notable of these was the Royal Opera House in Valletta, which is considered as "one of the major architectural and cultural projects undertaken by the British" by the Superintendence of Cultural Heritage.
The Gourgion Tower in Xewkija, which was included on the Antiquities List, was demolished by American forces in 1943 to make way for an airfield. Many of its inscriptions and decorated stones were retrieved and they are now in storage at Heritage Malta.
Palazzo Fremaux, a building included on the Antiquities List and which was scheduled as a Grade 2 property, was gradually demolished between 1990 and 2003. The demolition was condemned by local residents, the local government and non-governmental organizations.
The Azure Window, a  limestone natural arch on the island of Gozo in Malta. It was located in Dwejra Bay in the limits of San Lawrenz, close to the Inland Sea and the Fungus Rock. It was one of Malta's major tourist attractions. The arch, together with other natural features in the area of Dwejra, is featured in a number of international films and other media representations. The formation was anchored on the east end by the seaside cliff, arching over open water, to be anchored to a free standing pillar in the sea to the west of the cliff. It was created when two limestone sea caves collapsed. Following years of natural erosion causing parts of the arch to fall into the sea, the arch and free standing pillar collapsed completely during a storm in March 2017.
Villa St Ignatius, a 19th-century villa with historical and architectural significance, was partially demolished in late 2017. This was condemned by numerous non-governmental organizations and other entities.

Netherlands 
The German bombing of Rotterdam that took place on 14 May 1940, also known as the Rotterdam Blitz, decimated most of the historical city center of the Dutch city of Rotterdam, which at the time was the second-largest city in the country. During the bombing, hundreds of years worth of architecture and artwork were destroyed within hours.
 De Noord, a tower mill which had survived the Rotterdam Blitz, suffered a fire in July 1954 and was demolished soon after. 
 Kareol, a huge Art Deco building in Aerdenhout. It was built in 1908-1911. It was the largest house being built by a private owner in The Netherlands in the 20th century. It was demolished in 1979.
 Kolleg St. Ludwig, a friary in Vlodrop. It was demolished in 2015.

Norway 

From 1992 to 1995, members of the Norwegian black metal scene began a wave of arson attacks on medieval Christian churches. By 1996, there had been at least 50 attacks.

Poland

Warsaw Old Town, including the Royal Castle, Warsaw, Warsaw New Town, Łazienki Park including the Łazienki Palace, and Ujazdowski Castle, was destroyed by Nazi Germany in 1944, and later rebuilt from the 1950s to 1980s.

Portugal
Lisbon was almost destroyed during the 1755 Lisbon earthquake and subsequent fire and tsunami.
A small section of the 19th-century quarter Chiado was destroyed by fire on 25 August 1988. The eighteen damaged buildings were rebuilt in the following 20 years.

Romania
The 60-meter-high tower of Rotbav fortified church, dating back to the 13th century, collapsed on 20 February 2016.
Many historical buildings were demolished to construct the Centrul Civic in Bucharest.
Many old towns of different cities were destroyed partially or completely because of communist urban planning. Old towns of cities like Bacău, Bârlad, Câmpina, Galați, Orșova, Pitești, Ploiești, Râmnicu Vâlcea, and Suceava were completely demolished.
The 1989 fire of the Central University Library in Bucharest destroyed over 500,000 books and 3,700 manuscripts, including manuscripts of famous Romanian writings, such as many of Mircea Eliade's novel manuscripts.

Russia

 In Moscow alone losses of 1917–2006 are estimated at over 640 notable buildings (including 150 to 200 listed buildings, out of a total inventory of 3,500) – some disappeared completely, others were replaced with concrete replicas.
 President Boris Yeltsin ordered the shelling of the White House, seat of the Russian government, during his 1993 consolidation of power, causing a large fire and considerable damage to the top floors.
 'Mephistopheles', figure on a St Petersburg building on Lakhtinksaya Street known as the House with Mephistopheles, smashed by a fundamentalist Orthodox group in 2015.
 The original buildings of Metrowagonmash plant, founded by Savva Mamontov in 1897 and built in Russian Gothic style, were demolished between 2016 and 2019 to make way for block houses.

Serbia

A number of culturally and historically important buildings were destroyed in Belgrade during Operation Retribution, the Allied bombing of Yugoslavia in World War II, and various other battles. Destroyed buildings include the National Library of Serbia and the library's collection of 500,000 volumes and invaluable collection of medieval Cyrillic manuscripts and charters, King Alexander Bridge, Old Post Office, Sephard synagogue, and a number of other buildings.
The Yugoslav Ministry of Defence building, a cultural monument, was partially destroyed during the NATO bombing of Yugoslavia in 1999. NATO bombing also resulted in the damaging of medieval monuments, such as Gračanica Monastery, the Patriarchate of Peć and the Visoki Dečani, which are on the UNESCO's World Heritage list today. Furthemore, 19 hospitals and 20 health centers were damaged, including the University Hospital Center Dr Dragiša Mišović, which was founded in 1922. The Avala Tower, one of the most iconic symbols of the Serbian capital, was destroyed during the bombing.

Slovenia
 Partisan forces or their successors destroyed approximately 100 castles and manors during and after the Second World War. Examples include Ajman Manor, Belnek Castle, Boštanj Castle, Brdo Castle, Čušperk Castle, Dol Mansion, Dolena Castle, Gracar Castle, Haasberg Castle, Klevevž Castle, Kolovec Castle, Križ Castle, Krupa Castle, Mokronog Castle, Pogonik Castle, Radelstein Castle, Soteska Castle, Špitalič Manor, Turn Castle, and Volčji Potok Manor.
 An Allied raid heavily damaged Žužemberk Castle during the Second World War.
 Partisan forces or their successors destroyed many churches during and after the Second World War. Examples include the churches in Ajbelj, Gabrje, Hinje, Koče, Kočevska Reka, Morava, Plešivica, Srobotnik pri Velikih Laščah, Stari Log, Trava, Velika Račna, Zafara, and Žužemberk.
 A German raid during the Second World War destroyed the church in Dragatuš.
 Allied raids destroyed churches during the Second World War. Examples include the church in Dvor and Sts. Peter and Paul Church in Ptuj.

Soviet Union 

 During February–March 1944, the Soviet conducted the expulsion of the Chechens and Ingush from the North Caucasus as a part of the Soviet forced settlement program of the non-Russian ethnic minorities. The operation resulted in the deportation of 496,000 Chechens and Ingush populations, and the death of around a quarter of them. It was also accompanied by the destruction of local cultural and societal heritages; names of these nations were erased from the books and records; placenames were replaced with Russian ones; mosques were demolished; villages were razed; and the historical Nakh language manuscripts were almost destroyed.
 The native Crimean Tatars were deported by the Soviets from the peninsula in May 1944. Afterward, the government engaged in a full-scale detatarization campaign to continue the ethnic cleansing campaign, all the Tatar placenames being replaced with Russian ones, and the Muslim graveyards and religious objects were destroyed or converted into secular places.
 With the change in values imposed by communist ideology, the tradition of preservation was broken. Independent preservation societies, even those that defended only secular landmarks such as Moscow-based OIRU were disbanded by the end of the 1920s. A new anti-religious campaign, launched in 1929, coincided with collectivization of peasants; destruction of churches in the cities peaked around 1932. Several churches were demolished, including the Cathedral of Christ the Saviour in Moscow and St. Michael's Cathedral in Izhevsk. Both of these were rebuilt in the 1990s and 2000s.
 In 1959 Nikita Khrushchev launched his anti-religious campaign. By 1964 over 10 thousand churches out of 20 thousand were shut down (mostly in rural areas) and many were demolished. Of 58 monasteries and convents operating in 1959, only sixteen remained by 1964; of Moscow's fifty churches operating in 1959, thirty were closed and six demolished.

Spain 

 Because of the Ecclesiastical confiscations of Mendizábal, secularization of church properties in 1835–1836, several hundreds of church buildings, monasteries, etc., or civil buildings owned by the Church were partly or demolished. Many of the art works, libraries and archives contained were lost or pillaged in the time the buildings were abandoned and without owners. Among them were important buildings as Santa Caterina convent (the first gothic building in Iberian Peninsula) and Sant Francesc convent (gothic too, one of the richest in the country), both in Barcelona, or San Pedro de Arlanza Roman monastery, near Burgos, now ruined.
 Several monuments demolished in Calatayud: the church of Convent of Dominicos of San Pedro Mártir (1856), Convent of Trinidad (1856), Church of Santiago (1863), Church of San Torcuato and Santa Lucía (1869) and Church of San Miguel (1871).
 The leaning Torre Nueva in Zaragoza was demolished in 1892 amidst fears that it would topple.
Palacio de los Lasso de Castilla, was 15th century palace in Madrid which became the palace or residence of the Catholic Monarchs. It was demolished during the mid 19th century.
 Churches, monasteries, convents and libraries were destroyed during the Spanish Civil War.
 A Virxe da Barca sanctuary, located in Muxia, was destroyed by lightning.

Sweden 
 Tre Kronor, main residence of the Swedish Kings, destroyed by fire in 1697. Several important documents of the history of Sweden were lost in the fire.
 Klarakvarteren, a part of Stockholm from the 17th century. It was demolished in the 1960–70.
 The city of Norrköping was razed in 1719 by Russians. It was reconstructed with grid pattern streets and using the surviving Johannesborg fort as a quarry.

Switzerland 
 The city of Basel was devastated by the 1356 Basel earthquake.
 Pfäfers Abbey was destroyed in 1665 by fire.
 The city of Sion with Majoria and Tourbillon castles was destroyed by fire in 1788.
 Disentis Abbey was destroyed by fire in 1799 with its library and archives.
 The Kapellbrücke (Chapel Bridge) in Luzern (Lucerne) was substantially destroyed in 1993 by fire.

Ukraine 
 
Antonov An-225 Mriya, Kyiv: Severely damaged in 2022 during the Battle of Antonov Airport, part of the 2022 Russian invasion of Ukraine. The aircraft's owner, defense contractor Ukroboronprom, has announced that following the invasion, they will attempt to rebuild the aircraft.
Babi Yar Holocaust Memorial Center, Kyiv: Damaged on 1 March 2022 during the Battle of Kyiv, part of the 2022 Russian invasion of Ukraine. The memorial complex, which was under construction at the time, suffered structural damage to a museum building, as well as damage to the adjacent cemetery; other intrinsic elements of the site, including the memorial's synagogue and menorah sculpture, were not damaged.
Brotherhood Monastery, Kyiv: Demolished by Soviet authorities in 1935.
Church of the Tithes, Kyiv: The original 10th century church was destroyed by Mongol forces in the Siege of Kiev (1240). A new church was built on the site in the 19th century, but it too was destroyed by Soviet authorities in 1935.
Dormition Cathedral, Kharkiv: Damaged in 2022 during the Battle of Kharkiv, part of the 2022 Russian invasion of Ukraine. Artwork and stained glass in the cathedral were damaged.
Great Suburb Synagogue, Lviv: Demolished by invading Nazi forces in 1941.
Golden Rose Synagogue, Lviv: Oldest synagogue in Ukraine, sacked in 1941 and demolished in 1942 by the Nazi occupation forces.
Ivankiv Historical and Local History Museum, Ivankiv: Destroyed on 27 February 2022 during the Battle of Ivankiv, part of the 2022 Russian invasion of Ukraine. The museum contained folk artwork, including paintings by Maria Prymachenko and textile works of Hanna Veres. The number of artworks by Prymachenko, Veres, and other artists which were destroyed or damaged is currently unknown.
Khreshchatyk, Kyiv: The main street of Kyiv, containing many historic buildings. It was heavily mined by retreating Soviet forces in 1941, and as a result most buildings were destroyed. Some buildings were restored after the war, but most were replaced with new structures in the style of Stalinist architecture.
Kuindzhi Art Museum, Mariupol: Destroyed on 21 March 2022 during the Siege of Mariupol, part of the 2022 Russian invasion of Ukraine. The museum was dedicated to the life and work of Ukrainian-born artist Arkhip Kuindzhi. Although the works by Kuindzhi held by the museum were reportedly removed from the building prior to its destruction, the whereabouts of the artwork are unknown. Additionally, the status of the remainder of the museum's collection, which included around 2,000 works by fellow Ukrainian artists Ivan Aivazovsky, Mykola Hlushchenko, Tetyana Yablonska, Mykhailo Derehus, and others, remains unknown.
St. Michael's Golden-Domed Monastery, Kyiv: Demolished by Soviet authorities from 1934-1936. Some frescoes and mosaics were removed and taken to museums in the Russian FSR before demolition, only a portion of which were returned when the Cathedral was rebuilt in the 1990s.
St. Nicholas Military Cathedral, Kyiv: Demolished by Soviet authorities in 1934.
Slovo Building, Kharkiv: Damaged in 2022 during the Battle of Kharkiv, part of the 2022 Russian invasion of Ukraine.

United Kingdom 

The Dissolution of the Monasteries in the 1530s led to many monasteries, relics, and books being destroyed, such as Glastonbury Abbey.
The Great Fire of London in 1666 destroyed much of the old city, including Old St Paul's Cathedral, 87 parish churches, 44 Company Halls, the Royal Exchange, the Custom House, and the Bridewell Palace.
The Palace of Whitehall, the main residence of the English and later British monarchs, was destroyed by fire in 1698.
Arthur's O'on, a Roman temple or triumphal monument located near the Antonine Wall in Scotland, was demolished by a local landowner in 1743.
St Mary's Church in Reculver, an exemplar of Anglo-Saxon architecture and sculpture, was partially demolished in 1809.
The Palace of Westminster was almost destroyed by fire on 16 October 1834, and many documents about Britain's political history were lost. Only Westminster Hall and the Jewel Tower survived.
 The Temple of the Sun, a Gothic folly in Kew Gardens designed by William Chambers in 1761, was destroyed when a nearby cedar tree fell on it in a storm in 1916. Strangely, Chambers had also planted the cedar earlier, in 1725.
The Crystal Palace in London was destroyed by fire on 30 November 1936.
St Michael's Church in Coventry was a 14th-century cathedral that was nearly destroyed by the German Luftwaffe during the Coventry Blitz of 14 November 1940. Only the tower, spire, the outer wall, and the bronze effigy and tomb of its first bishop, Huyshe Yeatman-Biggs, survived. The ruins of this cathedral remain hallowed ground and are listed at Grade I.
Charles Church in Plymouth was entirely burned out by incendiary bombs dropped by the Luftwaffe on the nights of 21 and 22 March 1941. However, it has since been encircled by a roundabout and turned into "a memorial to those citizens of Plymouth who were killed in air-raids on the city in the 1939–45 war."
Coleshill House, a historic mansion in Oxfordshire (historically Berkshire) was destroyed in a fire in 1952, and many historic items within were lost. The ruins were demolished in 1958.
Several historic structures, such as the Euston Arch in London and the Royal Arch in Dundee, were demolished in the 1960s to make way for redeveloped infrastructure.
 The Imperial Hotel, London, designed by Charles Fitzroy Doll and built from 1905 to 1911, was demolished in 1966–67.
York Minster was severely damaged by fire in 1984, believed to have been caused by a lightning strike on the south transept.
The Baltic Exchange at 24-28 St Mary Axe in the City of London, was destroyed by a bomb placed there by the Provisional IRA in 1992. The site is now occupied by The Gherkin and the Baltic Exchange Memorial Glass can be seen in the National Maritime Museum.
A major fire in 1992 caused extensive damage to Windsor Castle, the largest inhabited castle in the world and one of the official residences of King Charles III.
The original Wembley Stadium was closed in October 2000 for redevelopment, and demolition commenced in December 2002, completing in 2003. The top of one of the twin towers was erected as a memorial in the park on the north side of Overton Close in the Saint Raphael's Estate.
The Carlton Tavern, an historic pub in Kilburn, London and the only building on its street to survive the Blitz during World War II, was demolished by its owner and without prior permission in April 2015. The pub was subsequently rebuilt and re-opened following a community campaign and planning appeals.
Clandon Park House, a historic mansion in Surrey, was severely damaged by fire on 29 April 2015, leaving the house "essentially a shell" and destroying thousands of historic items, including one of the footballs kicked across no-man's land on the first day of the Battle of the Somme in 1916.
The Royal Clarence Hotel in Exeter, considered England's oldest hotel, was almost destroyed by fire on 28 October 2016.
The Mackintosh Building of the Glasgow School of Art was extensively damaged by fire in May 2014 including the destruction of the artistically significant Mackintosh library but as restoration was completed and nearing reopening a far more devastating fire broke out on the night of 15 June 2018, destroying the building's interior. Alan Dunlop, the school's professor of architecture, said: "I can't see any restoration possible for the building itself. It looks destroyed."
The Beehive Mills, in Bolton, Lancashire, a Grade II Bolton listed building built in 1895, was demolished by agreement of the local authority in 2019 for the building of 121 houses.

North America

Belize 
 Several Maya sites such as San Estevan and Nohmul have been partly demolished.

Canada 

 The 1620 Colony of Avalon was destroyed in 1696 in the Siege of Ferryland during King William's War.
 In 1696, the Cathedral of St. John the Baptist in St. John's, Newfoundland, was destroyed by the French under the command of Pierre Le Moyne d'Iberville. The present cathedral was extensively damaged in The Great Fire of 1892.
 The 1754 St. Matthew's United Church (Halifax) was destroyed by fire in 1857 and rebuilt.
 In January 1839, St. James Anglican Church in Toronto was destroyed by a fire and rebuilt as St. James Cathedral by December 1839. This building was destroyed by another fire in 1849 and replaced by the current structure, the Cathedral Church of St. James, in 1853.
 Brock's Monument was heavily damaged after a bombing on 17 April 1840 and subsequently demolished; the monument was rebuilt in 1859.
 On the night of 25 April 1849, the Canadian Parliament buildings in Montreal were set ablaze by Loyalist rioters. The resulting fire consumed the Parliament's two libraries, parts of the archives of Upper Canada and Lower Canada, as well as more recent public documents. Over 23,000 volumes, forming the collections of the two parliamentary libraries, were lost.
 Christ Church Cathedral (Montreal) was rebuilt in 1859, replacing the previous structure destroyed in a fire in 1856.
 The 1665 Fort William in St. John's, Newfoundland, was demolished in 1881 to make room for the Newfoundland Railway.
 The 1881 St. James Anglican Church (Vancouver) was destroyed by a fire in 1886 and only rebuilt after 1935 (completed in 1937).
 Knox Presbyterian Church (Toronto) was severely damaged by fire in 1895 and eventually relocated in 1909.
 Crystal Palace (Montreal) was destroyed by fire in 1896.
 Centre Block of Parliament Hill in Ottawa was destroyed by fire on 3 February 1916, and immediately rebuilt.
 The Church of Nativité-de-la-Sainte-Vierge-d'Hochelaga was rebuilt in 1921 after fire destroyed the original 1877 church.
 Montreal City Hall from 1872–1878 was gutted by fire in 1922 and rebuilt by 1932.
 Church of the Ascension (Windsor, Ontario) was destroyed by fire in 1926 (rebuilt in 1927) and again in 1990 (repaired the same year).
 Metropolitan United Church was destroyed by fire in 1928 and rebuilt in 1929 to match the original 1874 building.
 Saint Boniface Cathedral in Winnipeg, built in 1830, was destroyed by fire in 1860, rebuilt in 1862, relocated in 1906, and destroyed by fire again in 1968. The current cathedral was rebuilt in 1972.
 Saint-Jacques Cathedral (Montreal) was destroyed by three fires in 1852, 1858, and 1933. The last rebuilt church was mostly demolished after 1973 with only the entrance preserved as Pavillon Judith-Jasmin for the Université du Québec à Montréal.
 The Old Government House, Built in 1876. From 1876-1883 Battleford was the seat of government and known as the Territorial Capital of the Northwest Territories. Battleford and the N.W.M.P. played a significant role during the 1885 North West  Rebellion. Burned down by arson in 2003
 St. Jude's Cathedral (Iqaluit) was destroyed by arson in 2005, along with Inuit art and artifacts.
 The Quebec City Armoury, built 1885–1888, was mostly destroyed by a fire in 2008 and rebuilt by 2016.

Guatemala 
The Maya codices were destroyed by Spanish priest Diego de Landa.
Iglesia del Carmen, a colonial church in Antigua, Guatemala, was damaged by several earthquakes.
The convent of Santa Clara in Antigua Guatemala was severely damaged during the earthquakes, today only its ruins survive.
 Tikal Temple 33 was destroyed in the 1960s by archaeologists to uncover earlier phases of construction of the pyramid.

Haiti 
 Much of Haiti's heritage was damaged or destroyed in the devastating earthquake in 2010, including the National Palace and the Port-au-Prince Cathedral.

Honduras 

The church of La Iglesia de Nuestro Señor de los Reyes was a Catholic church in the city of Comayagua built in 1555. It was damaged by an earthquake in 1808; finally the mayor's office ordered it demolished in 1829.
The church of the La limpia de la Inmaculada Concepcion was a Catholic church built in 1621 in Tegucigalpa. It suffered a fire in 1746, and stopped being used frequently. It was finally demolished in 1858 due to its poor condition.
The Caxa Real of Comaygua was heavily damaged due to earthquakes; it was rebuilt and re opened in 2013.
Tenampua, a ceremonial center of the Lenca culture from the classic Mesoamerican period, was heavily damaged during the Second Honduran Civil War in 1924.
Castillo Bogran, an abandoned 19th-century historical building in Santa Barbara that belonged to President Marco Bogran. The building has deteriorated extensively due to heavy rains, hurricanes, and wind. Only 30% of the structure survives today.
In April 2009 a fire occurred at the museum of the Saint Agustin College of Comayagua, destroying several pieces of art dating from the Spanish colonial era, including paintings made in Spain and relics that belonged to national heroes.
On 30 November 2017 a fire damaged the Museum del hombre In Teguciglapa, strongly damaging the structure of the building. Several pieces were saved but suffered extensive damage.
On 12 March 2019 there was a fire in the Museum of the Palace of Telecommunications in Tegucigalpa; 30% of the collection was destroyed and another part damaged.

United States

Pennsylvania Station was a Beaux-Arts style "architectural jewel" of New York City. Controversially, the above-ground portions of the station were demolished in 1963, making way for constructing the Madison Square Garden arena that opened in 1968. The controversy energized a historic preservation movement in New York City and the United States.
On 11 September 2001, Islamist terrorists affiliated with al-Qaeda destroyed both towers of the World Trade Center complex in New York City during the 11 September attacks.
The 2008 Universal Studios fire destroyed 40,000 to 50,000 films and video recordings and over 100,000 master audio recordings.
Since the start of the 1960s, the National Historic Landmark (NHL) program and the 1966 start of the National Register of Historic Places (NRHP), numerous landmarks designated in those programs have been destroyed. In some cases, the destruction was mitigated by documentation of the artifact or reproduction.
Losses by flood and wind damage include:
The Old Blenheim Bridge, built-in 1855 and the longest-surviving covered bridge in the United States, was destroyed by Hurricane Irene-related flooding in 2011.
Numerous NRHP-listed coastal properties in Mississippi and Louisiana were destroyed or significantly damaged by Hurricane Katrina in 2005.
Losses by fire, arson, or otherwise include:
The Russian-built Fort Ross Chapel, pre-1841, was destroyed in 1970 and subsequently reproduced.
 The National Personnel Records Center fire of 1973 destroyed about 80% of the military personnel records held at the National Personnel Records Center in St. Louis, MO.
The Provo Tabernacle (NRHP) was destroyed in a fire on 17 December 2010. It was subsequently rebuilt as the Provo City Center Temple, dedicated in 2016.
On 30 May 2020, multiple historical documents and artifacts were either damaged or destroyed when the Memorial to the Women of the Confederacy was attacked by rioters in Richmond, Virginia.
Losses by permitted processes include:
The Edwin H. Armstrong House in Yonkers, New York, was demolished in 1983.
Soldier Field stadium in Chicago, Illinois, built in 1924, was altered during a 2002 renovation.
The Army Medical Museum and Library in Washington, D.C., built in 1887, was demolished in 1969.
Leesylvania (plantation) was demolished in 1960 to make way for a road.
NASA wind tunnels including the Eight-Foot High Speed Tunnel (1936–2011) and Full Scale 30-by 60-Foot Tunnel (1936–2010).
Ships broken up include:
Wapama (steam schooner) (1915–2013), scrapped, though documented by Historic American Engineering Record (HAER) throughout its dismantling.
President (steamboat) (1924–2009), disassembled.
Other losses of covered bridges, landmarked or not, include:
Dooley Station Covered Bridge (1917–1960), arson; replaced by move of 1856-built Portland Mills Covered Bridge.
Bridgeton Covered Bridge (1868–2005), arson, replaced by a replica.
Jeffries Ford Covered Bridge (1915–2002), arson.
Welle Hess Covered Bridge No. S1 (1871–1981), collapsed, partially reproduced off-site.
Whites Bridge (1869–2013), arson.
Babb's Bridge (1864–1973), arson, replaced by a replica.
Honey Run Covered Bridge (1886–2018), destroyed during the 2018 Camp Fire
 In 2014, a 4,500-year-old Coast Miwok Indian burial ground and village was found near Larkspur, California, and destroyed to make way for a multimillion-dollar housing development.
NRHD Jobbers Canyon Historic District, in 1989, all 24 buildings were demolished for development, representing the largest National Register historic district loss to date.
Rich Bar in Plumas County, California, was a ghost town dating back to California Gold Rush, whose history was documented by Louise Clappe in her famed "Shirley Letters". One notable building, the Kellogg House, still contained original furnishings from the 1800s, and was continuously inhabited by Eva Eyraud, the famed "Woman on Indian Hill", from 1888 (when her family purchased the house from the Kelloggs) up until 1977. Plans to refurbish the house were thwarted when it was destroyed in the Dixie Fire on 23 or 24 July 2021.
 The Georgia Guidestones were heavily damaged in a bombing on 6 July 2022 and demolished completely later that same day.

South America

Argentina 

Old buildings in the city of San Juan were destroyed by an earthquake in 1944, including the Cathedral and the Government House.
The 1773  over the Reconquista River was renewed in 1964 and declared a National Historic Monument of Argentina. In 1997, the Company  demolished it.
On 18 October 1977, a fire burned the Teatro Argentino to the ground in La Plata. The building was later rebuilt, but in a different style.

Brazil 

 On 8 July 1978, the Museum of Modern Art of Rio de Janeiro was destroyed by fire.
 On 17 May 2010, the natural history collection of the Instituto Butantan was destroyed by fire.
 On 2 September 2018, the National Museum of Brazil was destroyed by fire.

Uruguay
In 1969, an original Flag of the Treinta y Tres from the Cisplatine War was stolen from the history museum. The national symbol was taken on 16 July 1969 by a revolutionary group called OPR-33. The historical flag was last seen in 1975 in Buenos Aires but has been considered missing since the day of its theft. This is still a matter of political debate.

Oceania

Australia

The Garden Palace in Sydney was destroyed by fire on 22 September 1882. 
The original Her Majesty's Theatre in Sydney was demolished in June 1933 to make way for a Woolworths retail store. 
The Jubilee Exhibition Building in Adelaide was demolished in 1962. It hosted the Adelaide Jubilee International Exhibition of 1887. 
The Federal Coffee Palace in Melbourne was demolished in 1971. 
The APA Building, also in Melbourne, was demolished in 1980. 
The Bellevue Hotel in Brisbane was demolished on 20 April 1979 by the Bjelke-Petersen Queensland State government amid mass protest. 
The Cloudland Dance Hall in Brisbane was demolished in 1982 to make way for an apartment complex. 
The Regent Theatre in Sydney was demolished in 1988. 
Tasmanian Aboriginal cave paintings, believed to be 800–8,000 years old, were vandalised in 2016.
Juukan Gorge cave, a site of Aboriginal cultural significance in the Pilbara region of Western Australia,where the estimated age of human artefacts was 46,000 years.
 Burrup Gorge, a site of Aboriginal cultural significance in the Burrup Peninsula, Western Australia.

New Zealand 
 The Cathedral of the Blessed Sacrament in Christchurch was demolished in 2021 by order of Bishop Paul Martin following damage in the 2010 and 2011 Canterbury Earthquakes. The cathedral was listed as a category 1 heritage building. Previous Bishop Barry Jones had approved a plan to restore the building but these plans were thrown out following his death in 2016. After extensive destruction of significant heritage buildings in the quakes and the loss of many community hubs within Christchurch the decision to demolish not only the Cathedral but also many other catholic churches (damaged and undamaged) was regarded by many in the city as an act of cultural vandalism.
The Christchurch Cathedral was severely damaged in the 2010 and 2011 Christchurch earthquakes. Demolition was planned and partially done before being stopped entirely in 2012 after government concerns in 2017 it was announced the church woad be reinstated.

See also 
 Art destruction
 Book burning and list of book-burning incidents
 List of destroyed libraries
 List of World Heritage in Danger
 Lost work, lost artworks and list of lost films
 Slighting
 Virtual heritage
 World Monuments Fund

Notes

References

Sources 
 Gaya Nuño, Juan Antonio. La arquitectura española en sus monumentos desaparecidos. Madrid, Espasa-Calpe, 1961.

Further reading 

  
  
 Shourie, Arun, S.R. Goel, Harsh Narain, J. Dubashi and Ram Swarup. Hindu Temples - What Happened to Them Vol. I, (A Preliminary Survey) (1990)

External links 
  (dedicated to the study, research, and documentation of the destruction and damage of historic heritage during the Balkan Wars of the 1990s. The website contains judicial documents from the International Criminal Tribunal for the former Yugoslavia (ICTY)).
 http://www.cracked.com/article_20149_6-mind-blowing-archeological-discoveries-destroyed-by-idiocy_p2.html

Architecture lists
Cultural heritage
Cultural lists